Urmila was wife of Laxmana, one of the three younger brothers of Lord Rama (also known as Mryada Purshottam Ram)

Urmila may also refer to:

Urmila Aryal, Nepalese politician
Urmila Bhatt (1934–1997), Indian actress
Urmila Bhoola, South African human rights lawyer
Urmila Kanitkar (21st century), Indian film actress in Marathi cinema
Urmila Mahanta (21st century), Indian actress
Urmila Matondkar (born 1974), an Indian actress
Urmila Satyanarayana, Indian classical dancer of bharatanatyam
Urmila Tiwari (21st century), Indian stage and television actress
Urmila Unni, Indian actress, appearing in Malayalam films
 Urmila (leafhopper), a leafhopper genus in the tribe Erythroneurini